The Zone 7 of Milan (in Italian: Zona 7 di Milano) is one of the 9 administrative zones of Milan, Italy. It is the most extended and the westernmost zone of the city.

Subdivision
The zone includes the following quarters: Assiano, Baggio, Figino, Fopponino, Forze Armate, Harar, La Maddalena, Muggiano, Porta Magenta, Quartiere degli Olmi, Quarto Cagnino, Quinto Romano, San Siro, Valsesia and Vercellese.

Notable places
San Siro Stadium
Linterno (ancient monastic grange)

References

External links

 Zone 7 of Milan (municipal website)

Zones of Milan